Sankalpam is a 1957 Telugu-language drama film, produced and directed by C. V. Ranganatha Das under the Sadhana films banner. It stars N. T. Rama Rao and Kusuma Kumari, with music composed by Susarla Dakshinamurthi.

Plot
The film begins with Raghu a burglar, when his mother Mangamma is terminally ill she calls her brother Gopaiah and requests him to knit his daughter Lakshmi with Raghu. Gopaiah agrees to the proposal despite the refusal of his son Papaiah as he aspires to perform Lakshmi's marriage with Shankaram, a rich & innocent guy. During the time of the wedding, Raghu gets arrested and sentenced to 3 months which leads to Gopaiah's death. Right now, Papaiah feels Lakshmi is a burden when soft-hearted Shankaram takes care of her.

Time passes, Raghu acquits, makes acquaintance with a huge burglar Kondalu, and goes into the trap of his sister Maya. During that time, Shankaram gets back to him through a play but he steals his money & jewelry from Lakshmi and presents them to Maya. Parallelly, Shankaram's maternal aunt Durgamma chides and seeks him to marry her daughter Suguna for which he disagrees until Lakshmi settles. So, he lures Maya in the disguise of a Zamindar and rectifies Raghu. So, Raghu pardons Lakshmi and starts a new life. Thereafter, Raghu is again arrested for a heist and gets 6 years imprisonment. By the time, Lakshmi is pregnant and gives birth to a baby boy but she could not bear the victimization of neighbors, so, she leaves the village. Eventually, Papaiah occupies Shakaram's house for his debt, but unfortunately, Kondalu robs his entire wealth, which makes him lose consciousness and become a wanderer.

Years roll by, and Raghu releases and meets Lakshmi when he takes a word from her not revealing his identity to their son Gopi until he reforms. Simultaneously, Shankaram who is in search of Lakshmi all these years also reaches them. After that, Raghu protects a bank agent from muggers who appreciate his honesty and appoints him as a security guard. Here Lakshmi too affirms the truth to Gopi. But being cognizant that his father is a criminal, Gopi runs away from the house and a dhobi couple rears him. He daily delivers ironed clothes to Kondalu's house when Maya starts liking him. Now, Kondalu plans a bank robbery but Raghu obstructs his way and safeguards the treasure at a secret place for which Kondalu & his gang tortures him. Fortunately, Gopi witnesses it, brings the Police and gets the gang arrested when Maya sacrifices her life to protect Gopi. At the same time, Papayya also arrives and regains his memory. Finally, the entire family is reunited and the movie ends on a happy note with the marriage of Shankaram & Suguna.

Cast
N. T. Rama Rao as Raghu
Kusuma Kumari as Lakshmi
Relangi as Shankaram 
Ramana Reddy as Papaiah
R. Nageswara Rao as Kondalu
Chadalavada as Lakshmaiah 
Allu Ramalingaiah
Suryakantham as Durgamma
Rajasulochana as Bhama
Girija as Suguna

Soundtrack

Music was composed by Susarla Dakshinamurthi. Lyrics were written by Anisetty.

References

Indian drama films
Films scored by Susarla Dakshinamurthi
1957 drama films
1957 films
Indian black-and-white films